Ma Li (born June 28, 1982) is a Chinese actress known for her roles in Heart for Heaven and Goodbye Mr. Loser.

Filmography

Film

Television series

References

External links
 

Living people
1982 births
Central Academy of Drama alumni
Chinese film actresses
Chinese television actresses
People from Dandong
Actresses from Liaoning
21st-century Chinese actresses
Manchu actresses